Alice Randall Marsh (1869-1929) was an American miniature painter and wife of fellow artist Frederick Dana Marsh (1872–1961).

Biography
Marsh née Randall was born in 1869 in Coldwater, Michigan. She attended the School of the Art Institute of Chicago. She also traveled to Paris, France, where she studied under Raphaël Collin, Frederick William MacMonnies, Luc-Olivier Merson, and James McNeill Whistler.

In 1895, while in Paris, she married Frederick Dana Marsh with whom she had three children. The couple met in Chicago, where they both attended the School of the Art Institute of Chicago and  exhibited work at the 1893 World's Columbian Exposition in Chicago, Illinois. Alice exhibited her work in the Illinois Building.

Marsh exhibited her paintings at the Paris Salon in 1895. The same year she exhibited at the Art Institute of Chicago

After many years abroad the couple returned to the United States in 1900. They lived at the Enclosure, an art colony in Nutley, New Jersey. The family relocated to New Rochelle, New York in 1914. Their son Reginald Marsh (1898–1954) became a painter. Their son James Randall Marsh (1896-1965) became a designer and metal worker. 

Marsh died on October 24, 1929 while on vacation in Italy.

References

External link
 Alice Randall Marsh on Findagrave

1869 births   
1929 deaths
19th-century American women artists
20th-century American women artists
Artists from Chicago
School of the Art Institute of Chicago alumni
American expatriates in France